Pascale Bruderer Wyss (born 28 July 1977 in Baden, Switzerland) is a Swiss politician. She was a member of the Council of States from 2011 to 2019 and a member of the National Council of Switzerland from 2002 to 2011. She was the President of the National Council in 2009 and 2010. She is a member of the Social Democratic Party.

Biography
Bruderer attended the University of Zurich, and the University of Växjö, where she earned a master's degree in political science.

Bruderer retired from politics and did not run for re-election in 2019. She was elected to the board of Bernexpo Holding in 2019.

References

External links

 Website (German)

1977 births
Living people
People from Baden, Switzerland
Social Democratic Party of Switzerland politicians
Members of the National Council (Switzerland)
Presidents of the National Council (Switzerland)
Members of the Council of States (Switzerland)
Aargau politicians
University of Zurich alumni